"High School", commonly known as "High School Life", is a song by Filipina singer and actress Sharon Cuneta. The song was written by George Canseco as the theme song for the 1981 film High School Scandal starring Gina Alajar and Sandy Andolong. It was released in 1981 during Cuneta's high school years when she was 15, and serves also as the lead single from Cuneta’s greatest hits album, High School (1981).

Background
The content of the song is about life in high school. Sharon Cuneta states that "high school life" is ganda (beautiful) in every memory and exciting and saya (nice).

The song is popular as a graduation song in the Philippines.

Cover versions
The song has been covered by Loisa Andalio with a video released in 2017. Other artists who covered the song include Bea Binene and Half Life Half Death (1995, from the compilation album Mga Himig Natin Vol. 2), and the song has also been sampled by other artists.

References

External links
 Discogr
 , Loisa Andalio's version

1980 songs
Sharon Cuneta songs
Songs about school
Taglish songs